Vauxhall Bridge is a footbridge in Bristol, England, that crosses the New Cut of the River Avon. At its northern end, the bridge also passes over the Bristol Harbour Railway line from Ashton Gate to Wapping Wharf, which runs along the bank of the New Cut at this point. The bridge was opened in 1900, replacing the Vauxhall ferry. On 30 December 1994, it was Grade II listed.

When the bridge was built, the New Cut was still in use by shipping to and from Bathurst Basin and the various shipyards that adjoined the cut, and consequently the bridge was built as a swing bridge. Navigation ceased on the New Cut in the 1930s, and the bridge was last swung in 1936.

References 

Bridges completed in 1900
Swing bridges in England
Pedestrian bridges in England
Bridges in Bristol
1900 establishments in England
Grade II listed bridges
Grade II listed buildings in Bristol